Phalba is an unincorporated community in Van Zandt County, in the U.S. state of Texas. According to the Handbook of Texas, the community had a population of 58 in 2000. It is located within the Dallas-Fort Worth metropolitan area.

History
Phalba was originally named for local settler John Snider, who bought the land where the hot springs were located on November 3, 1853; as a result, the community was also known as Snider Springs. The community was the site of three people being murdered on June 1, 1895, resulting in the suspect being charged with "hog theft". It kept the name Snider Springs until locals applied for a post office and named it in honor of the daughter of local settler Joseph William Jordan in 1897. The post office was established at Phalba in 1897 and remained in operation until 1907. After that, the community had its mail service rerouted to Mabank in nearby Kaufman County. The community had two churches, one business, several scattered houses, and a population of 65 in 1936. During the Great Depression, sewing rooms made clothing for the poor in 1939. Phalba had a population of 30 in 1966 and had two churches, three businesses, and a cemetery. Its population grew to 58 in 1974, but only a few scattered houses and a few small businesses remained there by 1987. The population remained at 58 in 2000.

Geography

Education
Phalba had its own school in 1890 and had 104 students enrolled in 1904. It joined the Canton Independent School District in 1950. It also had a school in 1936. The community continues to be served by the Canton ISD to this day.

References

Unincorporated communities in Van Zandt County, Texas
Unincorporated communities in Texas